Tobias Hecht (born 18 February 1964) is an American anthropologist, ethnographer, and translator.

Hecht was born in Seattle, Washington. He received his B.A. from Columbia University in 1986 and his Ph.D. in Social Anthropology in 1995 from the University of Cambridge, and was the winner of the 2002 Margaret Mead Award, for his book At Home in the Street: Street Children of Northeast Brazil, an innovative study of street children in Northeastern Brazil.

In 2002–2003 he was the recipient of a Harry Frank Guggenheim Foundation research grant for his work on The violent life of Bruna Verissimo: An experimental ethnographic biography of a homeless Brazilian youth. His 2006 novel After Life: An Ethnographic Novel was based in part on that work.

In 2005 Hecht placed second in the Hucha de Oro, Spain's most important literary competition for short works of fiction. He taught at Pomona College.

Selected bibliography
Publications
After Life: An Ethnographic Novel, Duke University Press, March 2006. 
"La sexta columna" in Yardbird y otros cuentos : Concurso de Cuentos de las Cajas de Ahorros, XXXIII Convocatoria Hucha de Oro, octubre 2005, April 2006.
At Home in the Street: Street Children of Northeast Brazil, Cambridge University Press, May 13, 1998. 
El cerdito pulcro also entitled The Remarkably Clean Life of a Little Pig, a bilingual edition with illustrations by Cristina Perez Navarro, Ecologistas en Accion, (Madrid, Spain), October 2016. 

Edited books
(with Isabel Balseiro) South Africa: A Traveler's Literary Companion, Whereabouts Press, August 11, 2009. 
Minor Omissions: Children in Latin American History and Society, University of Wisconsin Press, September 7, 2002. 

Translations
Cristina Peri Rossi, The Museum of Useless Efforts, University of Nebraska Press, April 2001.

Notes

External links
Tobias Hecht's website

1964 births
Alumni of Clare Hall, Cambridge
American anthropologists
Living people

Columbia College (New York) alumni
People from Seattle
Academics from Washington (state)
American ethnographers
Pomona College faculty